The Congress of the Republic, also known as the National Congress, represented the Venezuelan Legislative Branch until 1999. It had a bicameral composition: a Chamber of Senators (or Senate) and a Chamber of Deputies.
The last president of the Chamber of Senators (who, in turn, served as President of Congress) was Luis Alfonso Dávila, elected senator in the State of Anzoátegui by the Socialist-leaning party Movimiento Quinta República; the last president of the Chamber of Deputies (who also served as Vice President of Congress) was Henrique Capriles Radonski, who was elected deputy in the State of Zulia by the Christian Socialist party COPEI.

Different sectors of Venezuelan political life, both in the opposition and in government, have raised the possibility that, at some point, two chambers will again function in the Venezuelan Legislative Branch, resuming their bicameral composition. However, so far these are only proposals that have been made.

Official names 
According to the different Constitutions that Venezuela has had:

 Congreso General de Venezuela, in Constitution of 1811 and 1819 (19 years).
 Congreso del Estado de Venezuela, in Constitution of 1830, 1857 and 1858 (34 years).
 Congreso de los Estados Unidos de Venezuela, in Constitution of 1864, 1874, 1881, 1891, 1893, 1901, 1904, 1909, 1914, 1922, 1925, 1928, 1929, 1931, 1936 and 1947 (89 years).
 Congreso de la República de Venezuela, in Constitution of 1953 and 1961 (46 years).

Elections
1832 Venezuelan parliamentary election
1835 Venezuelan parliamentary election
1838 Venezuelan parliamentary election
1841 Venezuelan parliamentary election
1844 Venezuelan parliamentary election
1847 Venezuelan parliamentary election
1850 Venezuelan parliamentary election
1853 Venezuelan parliamentary election
1856 Venezuelan parliamentary election
1859 Venezuelan parliamentary election
1863 Venezuelan parliamentary election
1873 Venezuelan parliamentary election
1877 Venezuelan parliamentary election
1882 Venezuelan parliamentary election
1888 Venezuelan parliamentary election
1890 Venezuelan parliamentary election
1894 Venezuelan parliamentary election
1898 Venezuelan parliamentary election
1922 Venezuelan parliamentary election
1929 Venezuelan parliamentary election
1931 Venezuelan general election
1936 Venezuelan general election
1941 Venezuelan parliamentary election
1947 Venezuelan general election
1958 Venezuelan general election
1963 Venezuelan general election
1968 Venezuelan general election
1973 Venezuelan general election
1978 Venezuelan general election
1983 Venezuelan general election
1988 Venezuelan general election
1993 Venezuelan general election
1998 Venezuelan parliamentary election

Representatives

See also
 :Category:Members of the Chamber of Deputies (Venezuela)
 National Assembly (Venezuela)
 Senate of Venezuela
Storming of the Venezuelan National Congress

References

Legislative branch of the Government of Venezuela
Defunct bicameral legislatures
2000 disestablishments in Venezuela
History of Venezuela
1811 establishments in Venezuela